All Sides is a 2002 album by multi-cultural pop music boy band LMNT, and the group's sole album.

Reception
All Sides was released after the American boy band craze had already peaked; the bands NSYNC and the Backstreet Boys, for example, were already on hiatus by June 2002. The album did gain some modest success, as the single, "Juliet", managed to reach number one on Radio Disney, where it remained for eight consecutive weeks. It also reached No. 49 on the Billboard Hot 100 Singles Sales Chart. However, it ultimately failed to gain the group any significant popularity.The album received generally negative reviews. AllMusic.com reviewer Michael Gallucci stated: "Their debut album is filled with post-millennium teen pop and all of its trappings", criticizing the use of "forced slang, suburban hip-hop touches, and a canned, manufactured sound that's both insincere and fake". Entertainment Weekly reviewer Kristen Baldwin wasn't impressed, either: "[LMNT] is unlikely to revive the [Boy Band] genre". Both reviewers also stated that they were little more than rejects from the ABC/MTV reality show, "Making the Band", and as such, there wasn't much to be expected from their sound.

Track listing

Charts

References 

2002 debut albums
Atlantic Records albums